Trauma Center is a series of video games developed by Atlus and published by Atlus (Japan, North America) and Nintendo (Europe). Beginning with Trauma Center: Under the Knife in 2005 for the Nintendo DS, the series released four more entries on the DS and Wii. The gameplay is split between a surgical gameplay simulation, and visual novel storytelling. While mostly dealing with different characters, the games share a common setting of a near-future Earth where advanced medical procedures are used to treat several patients, including outbreaks of deadly viruses. A recurring organisation is Caduceus, a worldwide semi-covert medical foundation.

The series was created by Katsura Hashino, who wanted to use the DS's controls to explore a simulation type only previously possible on PCs. Following the first game, a dedicated production team dubbed "CaduceTeam" was created to handle future games. Beginning with the Wii remake Second Opinion, the series was directed by Daisuke Kanada.

Titles

Trauma Center: Under the Knife is the first entry in the series, released on the Nintendo DS. It was published in Japan and North America in 2005, and in Europe the following year. The game follows protagonist Derek Stiles as he confronts a manmade disease called GUILT.
Trauma Center: Second Opinion is the second entry and a remake of the first game. It released as a launch title for the Wii in Japan and North America in 2006, and the following year in Europe and Australia. In addition to revisiting Stiles's battle against GUILT, Second Opinion adds missions for surgeon Naomi Kimishima, and a new chapter closing off both narratives.
Trauma Center: New Blood is the third entry in the series, released for the Wii first in North America in 2007, then in Japan and Europe regions in 2008, and Australia in 2009. The narrative follows two new doctors as they are recruited to fight Stigma, a new manmade disease spreading across the world.
Trauma Center: Under the Knife 2 is the fourth entry, a direct sequel to the first game developed for the DS. It was released in North America and Japan in 2008. The story features Derek Stiles when he encounters a new GUILT-based threat.
Trauma Team, the fifth and to-date final entry and cited as a spin-off title within the series universe, was released in 2010 in Japan and North America. The narrative, split across six different characters working at Resurgam First Care, focuses on the emerging threat of a new disease.

Common elements

Gameplay

The gameplay and presentation of Trauma Center use two recurring features; surgery simulation carried out from a first-person view; and the narrative delivered using a visual novel style. Trauma Team includes surgery, but also uses five other professions; emergency medicine where patients at the scene are given rapid treatments, endoscopy for small-scale internal treatment, orthopedics which focuses on skeletal operations and reconstruction, diagnosis for determining medical conditions through a routine of speaking with the patient and examining medical scans, and forensic medicine where evidence from crime scenes and the victims are used to reach a conclusion to the case.

During surgery, the player operates on the patient use a variety of tools; these include the scalpel, healing gel, a syringe for injecting health boosts and other substances, a laser, an ultrasound scan, a drain, forceps, and thread for stitching wounds. Later titles introduce the defibrillator for reviving dying patients. Operation types range from organ repair and tumor extraction to skin grafts and bone repair. The DS titles make use of the touch screen, with players selecting and using tools using icons. For Second Opinion and New Blood, the controls were adjusted to work with the Wii Remote and Nunchuk, and added functions including the defibrillator.

A recurring gameplay mechanic across the series is the Healing Touch, an ability which grants superhuman advantages to surgeons who hold it. Its effects vary between individuals, with demonstrated abilities including slowing time, healing patients, and stopping a patient's health from dropping. It is activated by drawing a star shape on the screen. The Healing Touch and similar fantastical elements were toned down or removed for Trauma Team. Both New Blood and Trauma Team included local cooperative multiplayer options.

Setting and themes
The Trauma Center series is set in a near-future version of Earth where medical advances have led to the development of cures for previously major diseases such as AIDS and cancer. A key organisation is Caduceus; while outwardly a medical research body for studying intractable diseases, it has a semi-covert role fighting bioterrorism using artificial viruses. Originally founded in Europe, Caduceus has branches established around the world. A recurring element across the series is the presence of science fiction or supernatural elements in the narratives. Trauma Team made less use of these elements, including not using the Healing Touch.

All the Trauma Center titles share the same universe and timeline. The original game and its remake are set in the year 2018. Under the Knife 2 is set three years after the first game's events. Trauma Team takes place at some point after the events of Second Opinion, though it is not directly connected to the rest of the series. The action takes place around the locality of Resurgam First Care, a fictional hospital in the United States where many of the protagonists work. New Blood is set ten years after the events of Second Opinion. Two recurring characters are Naomi Kimishima, a player character in Second Opinion and Trauma Team; and Derek Stiles, who makes appearances in each title in the series.

A recurring narrative theme in the Trauma Center series was saving life through surgery, and the passion of doctors to save lives. In Second Opinion, a secondary theme was the damaging impact of surgery being used for the wrong reasons. The narrative themes of New Blood are the battle to save lives and the preciousness of life. The story of Under the Knife 2 incorporated issues of treating the poor, doctor shortages, and anti-aging medicine. In Trauma Team, the story focused on how people lived full lives in a world that could see terrible life-threatening events, drawing direct inspiration from the 2009 swine flu pandemic.

Development
The original Trauma Center was created by Atlus staff member Katsura Hashino, who acted as producer. Beginning production in 2004, the team wanted to recreate the surgical simulation gameplay of PC titles for the DS, since its controls and hardware were more capable compared to others of the time. Many of the staff were veterans of Atlus's role-playing Megami Tensei, making production challenging due to the team's inexperience. Following the success of Under the Knife, Hashino formed some of the team into a dedicated team to work on the series; they were internally known as "CaduceTeam", made up of what director Daisuke Kanada described as Atlus's most enthusiastic gamers. Kanada has worked on multiple Megami Tensei titles and collaborated with Hashino on several games since Maken X in 1999; Second Opinion was his debut as a director. Production of Second Opinion began in January 2006.

Recurring staff included Kanada as director; artist Masayuki Doi, who replaced original artist Maguro Ikehata from Second Opinion onwards; programmer Takaaki Ikeda; and scenario writer Shogo Isogai, who worked on Under the Knife, Second Opinion and New Blood. Under the Knife was directed by Kazuya Niinou, who was later lead designer on the original Etrian Odyssey for Atlus; and would later work on titles for Imageepoch and Square Enix. MediaVision helped with production on New Blood, while Vanguard developed Under the Knife 2 under Atlus's supervision. Trauma Team began development in 2007, beginning as being close to a mainline entry before expanding into its current form, covering multiple medical professions.

Reception

In a series retrospective, Peter Davison of USGamer noted both the series' notable position in Atlus's gaming library, and how the titles made use of the Nintendo console mechanics.

References
Citations

Notes

External links
 

 
Sega Games franchises
Video game franchises introduced in 2005